István Hahn (Budapest, 28 March 1913 - Budapest, 26 July 1984), was a Hungarian historian and a member of the Hungarian Academy of Sciences.

He wrote important papers on the movements of the poor free in the towns of late antiquity, dependency relations in antiquity, and forms of proprietorship in archaic Greece.

Selected publications
Traumdeutung und gesellschaftliche Wirklichkeit: Artemidorus Daldianus als sozialgeschichtliche Quelle. Konstanz, Univ.-Verl., 1992.

References

20th-century Hungarian historians
Members of the Hungarian Academy of Sciences
1913 births
1984 deaths
Writers from Budapest